Metachanda brunneopunctella is a moth species in the oecophorine tribe Metachandini. It was described by Henry Legrand in 1965. It is found in Seychelles on Mahé Island and Curieuse Island, the former of which is its type locality.

References

Oecophorinae
Moths described in 1965
Moths of Seychelles